Coleophora creola is a species of moth in the family Coleophoridae. It is found in Cape Verde, where it has been recorded from Sal.

References 

 

creola
Moths described in 2015
Moths of Africa